József Sákovics (26 July 1927 – 2 January 2009) was a Hungarian épée and foil fencer. He won a silver and two bronze medals at two Olympic Games. He was the husband of Lídia Sákovicsné Dömölky, who also fenced at the Olympics.

References

External links
 

1927 births
2009 deaths
Hungarian male épée fencers
Olympic fencers of Hungary
Fencers at the 1952 Summer Olympics
Fencers at the 1956 Summer Olympics
Fencers at the 1960 Summer Olympics
Olympic silver medalists for Hungary
Olympic bronze medalists for Hungary
Olympic medalists in fencing
Martial artists from Budapest
Medalists at the 1952 Summer Olympics
Medalists at the 1956 Summer Olympics
Hungarian male foil fencers
20th-century Hungarian people
21st-century Hungarian people